Park Estates is a neighborhood in Long Beach, California.  It is adjacent to the Los Altos and Alamitos Heights neighborhoods, as well as Recreation Park and California State University, Long Beach.

History
The neighborhood was developed by Lloyd Whaley in 1948.

Architecture

See also
Neighborhoods of Long Beach, California

References

Geography of Long Beach, California
Park Estates